Ronaldo Carvalho may also refer to:

Ronaldo de Carvalho (born 1959), Brazilian Olympic rower
Ronaldo Carvalho (tennis) (born 1979), Brazilian tennis player